USS Carl M. Levin (DDG-120) is a United States Navy  Flight IIA guided missile destroyer, the 70th overall for the class. The ship is named for Carl Levin, a former United States Senator and Chairman of the United States Senate Committee on Armed Services.

Construction and career 
The contract for the ship, along with the name, was first announced in a press release from General Dynamics, parent company of Bath Iron Works, on 31 March 2016.  The official designation of DDG-120 as Carl M. Levin by Secretary of the Navy Ray Mabus was announced on 11 April 2016.

On 2 October 2021, Carl M. Levin was christened at the Bath Iron Works shipyard in Bath, Maine. She is the 42nd Flight IIA ship, and the fifth of the "technology insertion" (TI) builds with elements of the follow-on Flight III series. She is fitted with the Aegis Combat System baseline 9 which includes integrated air and missile defense capability. 

Carl M. Levin completed her sea trials on 9 December 2022 and delivered to the United States Navy on 26 January 2023.

The ship is expected to be commissioned during the spring of 2023.

Ship's Seal 
Seal: The coat of arms as blazoned in full color on a white oval, enclosed by a dark blue border edged on the outside with a gold rope and inscribed “USS CARL M. LEVIN” above and “DDG 120” below in gold.

Blazon 
Shield: Gules, three pales Argent between two square flaunches Azure (Dark Blue) bearing six six-pointed mullets, three and three Argent (Silver Gray).

Crest: From a wreath Argent and Azure a bald eagle crouched wings inverted Proper, clutching in dexter claw a Senate gavel Proper and in sinister claw a sword fesswise Proper; in chief radiant light Or surmounted by a Phrygian cap Gules, banded of the second and inscribed “LIBERTY” of the first.

Supporters: Saltirewise a United States Navy Officer’s sword and Chief Petty Officer’s cutlass saltirewise, points downward.

Motto: A tri-parted scroll Gules doubled Argent inscribed “TENACIOUS IN THE FIGHT” of the last.

Symbolism
Shield: The hourglass shaped division of the field resembles the shape of the historic Senate gavel, implying Mr. Levin’s service as a United States Senator. The six six-pointed stars honor Mr. Levin’s 36 years in the Senate. The seven vertical stripes over a blue field denote USS CARL M. LEVIN (DDG 120) as the 70th ship in its class. The national colors of the United States are Red, White and Blue.

Crest: The bald eagle, embodying the spirit of the United States, emphasizes the nation’s virtues of life, liberty and the pursuit of happiness. The sword and Senate gavel allude to Mr. Levin’s service as a Senator and position of Chairman of the Armed Services Committee. The Phrygian (Liberty) cap amongst the radiant light conveys Mr. Levin’s work to protect the Great Lakes and their many lighthouses along Michigan’s coastline. The Liberty cap, adapted from the United States Senate Seal, conveys the paramount nature of America’s ethics and values, emphasized by the golden radiant light. Additionally, the eagle is featured on the coat of arms of the State of Michigan, in tribute to Mr. Levin’s home state.

Supporters: The Navy Officer sword and enlisted cutlass pay tribute to the command and crew, representing authority, professionalism and unity in the accomplishment of their mission.

Motto: The motto, “TENACIOUS IN THE FIGHT,” expresses the steadfast and determined motivation of the command and crew to triumph over adversity.

References

External links 

DDG 120 - USS Carl M. Levin

2021 ships
Arleigh Burke-class destroyers